[]